Saint Valerie may refer to:

Valerie of Limoges, according to legend, an associate of Saint Martial, a cephalophoric martyr
Valeria of Milan, often known as St Valerie, venerated in Thibodaux, Louisiana
Valeria, a Christian saint martyred with Anesius